Swedish submissions for the Academy Award for Best International Feature Film are handed out annually by representatives from the Guldbagge Awards jury.

Sweden has submitted films for consideration in the Best Foreign Language Film category since the inaugural award in 1956. The Swedes have sent more films than any other country, except for France, Italy, Japan and Spain, and have only failed to submit a film one time in the past thirty years.

16 films from Sweden have been nominated for the Academy Award: The Virgin Spring (1960), Through a Glass Darkly (1961), Raven's End (1964), Dear John (1965), Ådalen '31 (1969), The Emigrants (1971), The New Land (1972), Flight of the Eagle (1982), Fanny and Alexander (1983), The Ox (1991), All Things Fair (1995), Under the Sun (1999), Evil (2003) and As It Is in Heaven (2004), A Man Called Ove (2016), The Square (2017 film) (2017).  Three Swedish films have won the Oscar: The Virgin Spring (1960), Through a Glass Darkly (1961) and Fanny and Alexander (1983). All the winners have been directed by Ingmar Bergman, who represented Sweden a record eight times. His Scenes from a Marriage was submitted in 1974, but was disqualified because it had previously aired on Swedish television. According to Robert Osborne, the country did not enter in 1975 as a protest. In 1978, however, the country did not submit his film Autumn Sonata and made no entry. Other prominent directors include Bo Widerberg and Jan Troell, both who have had three of their films nominated. The 1988 winner Pelle the Conqueror was a Swedish-Danish co-production, but was submitted by Denmark. In 2002 there was a bit of controversy as Sweden's submission Lilja 4-ever had most of its dialogue in Russian and not Swedish. Eventually it was accepted as eligible, but did not receive a nomination.

Submissions
The Academy of Motion Picture Arts and Sciences has invited the film industries of various countries to submit their best film for the Academy Award for Best Foreign Language Film since 1956. The Foreign Language Film Award Committee oversees the process and reviews all the submitted films. Following this, they vote via secret ballot to determine the five nominees for the award. Below is a list of the films that have been submitted by Sweden for review by the Academy for the award by year.

See also
List of Academy Award winners and nominees for Best Foreign Language Film
List of Academy Award-winning foreign language films
Cinema of Sweden

Notes

References

External links
The Official Academy Awards Database
The Motion Picture Credits Database
IMDb Academy Awards Page

Sweden
Academy Award